"Goodbye Blinky Bill" is a song written and recorded by John Williamson with Bullamakanka and John’s daughters Ami and Georgie. The song was released in a limited edition in March 1986 as the only single from Williamson's 1986 compilation album All the Best.

The song is a conservation song, raising awareness of the decline in numbers of the Australian koala due to deforestation of eucalypts trees; with reference to an anthropomorphic koala named Blinky Bill. A$1 from each sale was donated to the Koala Preservation Society in Port Macquarie.

The song has been covered by The Wayfarers.

Track listing 
 7" 
Side A: "Goodbye Blinky Bill"  (with Ami & Georgie Williamson and Bullamakanka)  
Side B: "Koala Koala"

Release history

References

John Williamson (singer) songs
1986 songs
1986 singles
Environmental songs
Festival Records singles